Amédée Wilfrid Proulx (August 31, 1932 – November 22, 1993) was an American Bishop of the Catholic Church. He served as auxiliary bishop of the Diocese of Portland in the state of Maine from 1975 until his death in 1993.

Biography
Born in Sanford, Maine of Franco-American descent, Amédée Proulx was ordained a priest for the Diocese of Portland on May 31, 1958.  On September 16, 1975 Pope Paul VI appointed him as the Titular Bishop of Clypia and Auxiliary Bishop of Portland.  He was ordained a bishop by Bishop Edward O'Leary on November 12, 1975. The principal co-consecrators were Bishops Timothy Harrington of Worcester and Odore Gendron of Manchester. He continued to serve as an auxiliary bishop until his death on November 22, 1993, at the age of 61.

References

1932 births
1993 deaths
People from Sanford, Maine
Roman Catholic Diocese of Portland
20th-century American Roman Catholic titular bishops
Religious leaders from Maine
Catholics from Maine
American people of French-Canadian descent